The Indigenous Peoples' Biocultural Climate Change Assessment Initiative (IPCCA) is an international indigenous research initiative arising out of the United Nations Permanent Forum on Indigenous Issues, where it was noted:

" .. cultures that support TK [Traditional Knowledge] around the world are often living in marginal ecosystems, such as the Arctic, mountains, deserts and small islands ..[which are] .. often the sources of key ecosystem services ....  most vulnerable to climate change"

At the Seventh Session of the Permanent Forum, held from 21 April to 2 May 2008, it was recommended that:

" ..the United Nations University – Institute of Advanced Studies, university research centres and relevant United Nations agencies conduct further studies on the impacts of climate change and climate change responses on indigenous peoples who are living in highly fragile ecosystems".

From this recommendation, a formal Indigenous Peoples Climate Change Assessment Initiative was formed between the United Nations University's Institute of Advanced Studies and a number of non-United Nations partners; with an indigenous led steering committee coordinated by a secretariat housed within the Association for Nature and Sustainable Development (ANDES), Peru; and an objective:

"To empower indigenous peoples to develop and use indigenous frameworks to assess the impact of climate change on their communities and ecosystems and to develop and implement strategies for building indigenous resilience and adaptive strategies to mitigate impacts while enhancing biocultural diversity for food sovereignty and self determined development or “Buen Vivir.”"

Global Summit

On the 20–24 April 2009, members of the Indigenous Peoples' Biocultural Climate Change Assessment Initiative assisted a Global Summit of Indigenous Peoples held in Anchorage (Alaska) to discuss Climate Change

"The purpose of the Summit was to enable indigenous peoples from all regions of the globe to exchange their knowledge and experience in adapting to the impacts of climate change, and to develop key messages and recommendations to be articulated to the world at the Conference of Parties (COP) to the UN Framework Convention on Climate Change in Copenhagen, Denmark in December 2009"

The United Nations University - Institute of Advanced Studies provided significant and substantive assistance preparing background papers for this Summit, with the logistics of this Summit, plus with rapporteuring for this Summit, one of the outcomes of which was an 'Anchorage Declaration' of Indigenous Peoples on Climate Change

Indigenous participation in climate change research – an academic perspective 
The authors of "Indigenous framework for observing and responding to climate change in Alaska", an article appearing in the March 2013 issue of Climatic Change, argue that there needs to be a five-pronged approach to increasing the participation of indigenous peoples in creating climate-change remedies. 
 Employ communities in the formulation of solutions to climate change.
 Foster an environment where multiple ways of understanding, both western and indigenous, can be accepted and celebrated. 
 Provide direct assistance on the community-level for those seeking out concrete ways to protect themselves from climate-change related issues. 
 Encourage teamwork for devising solutions for climate change that satisfy both western and indigenous points of view. 
 Strengthen communication networks of tribes, scientists, and other anti-climate-change actors so that collaboration can provide more specific fixes to climate change.

Further reading
 IUCN (April 2008) "Indigenous and Traditional Peoples and Climate Change: Summary Version" On-Line PaperAccessed 5 December 2009
 Dounias, Edmond (2009) "The sentinel key role of indigenous peoples in the assessment of climate change effects on tropical forests" Climate Change: Global Risks, Challenges and Decisions, On-line paper Accessed 6 December 2009
 Mclean, Kirsty Galloway McLean (2009) Advance Guard: Climate Change Impacts, Adaptation, Mitigation and Indigenous Peoples - a compendium of case studies (Advance Reading Copy), United Nations University - Institute of Advanced Studies Traditional Knowledge Initiative Accessed 6 December 2009 
 NCCARF and UoM (2013) Indigenous Dimensions of Climate Change, Information Website.

See also

 United Nations Permanent Forum on Indigenous Issues
 United Nations University
 Global warming
 Effects of global warming
 Indigenous peoples
 Traditional Ecological Knowledge

External links
 Indigenous Peoples Climate Change Assessment Initiative WebsiteAccessed 5 December 2009
 United Nations University Traditional Knowledge Initiative's "Indigenous Peoples Climate Change Assessment" WebsiteAccessed 5 December 2009
 United Nations University's 'Our World 2' Indigenous voices on climate change filmsAccessed 5 December 2009

References

International climate change organizations
Indigenous peoples and the environment